Frank Rudolph Wolf (born January 30, 1939) is an American politician who served as the U.S. representative for  from 1981 to 2015. A member of the Republican Party, he announced in December 2013 that he would not run for reelection in 2014. Wolf retired at the conclusion of his 17th term in office, in January 2015. At the time of his retirement, he was the dean of the state's congressional delegation, having served for 34 consecutive years.

Early life, education and early political career

Born and raised in Philadelphia, Wolf overcame an early speech impediment which caused him to stutter. Attending Pennsylvania State University, he was a member of Alpha Sigma Phi fraternity, received a degree in political science and subsequently earned a law degree from Georgetown University Law Center in Washington, D.C. He then joined the United States Army as a reservist and became a lawyer for the military.

Wolf entered politics in 1968, at the age of 29, when he became a legislative assistant to Edward Biester, the Republican congressman from Pennsylvania's 8th congressional district. From 1971 to 1975, Wolf served as an assistant to Secretary of the Interior Rogers Morton.

U.S. House of Representatives

Elections

During the 1976 presidential election year, Wolf's first campaign for Virginia's 10th congressional district ended with his loss in the Republican primary to Vince Callahan by 45%–42%. Two years later, amidst the 1978 midterm elections, he won the Republican nomination unopposed, but lost the general election to the incumbent Democrat, Joseph L. Fisher, 53%–47%.

In the 1980 House election, when Ronald Reagan's decisive victory in the presidential election brought with it a 34-seat swing in the House, Wolf's third run proved to be successful; he won the Republican primary with 75% of the vote and then defeated Fisher in a rematch, 51%–49%. In the 1982 midterms, Wolf won re-election with 53% of the vote. He would never face another contest anywhere near that close.

Wolf did not face a Democratic opponent in 1994 and 2000, winning both with over 80% of the votes against third party candidates. After 1982, his closest races were in the Democratic wave elections of 2006 and 2008. On both occasions he defeated professor Judy Feder, by 57%–41% and 59%–39%, respectively. Those were the only occasions after 1982 that he received below 60 percent of the vote.

In the 2012 election, as Republican presidential nominee Mitt Romney carried the district by 1%, Wolf was re-elected by 20%. In September 2013, it was announced that Wolf was to be challenged in the 2014 election by Democrat Richard Bolger, a Fairfax attorney and small business owner. In December 2013, Wolf announced his intention to retire from politics, leaving office in January 2015just days before his 76th birthday. He was succeeded by his former aide, Republican State Delegate Barbara Comstock.

Wolf's district was significantly redrawn several times during his 34 years in office. For his first six terms, he represented a compact Northern Virginia-based district covering Fairfax, Arlington, and Loudoun counties. The 1990 redistricting by a Democratic Virginia General Assembly drew heavily Democratic Arlington County into the neighboring 8th District, while drawing the more Democratic portions of Fairfax County into the new 11th district. To make up for the loss of population, the 10th was pushed to the west and south to encompass parts of the congressional district held by U.S. Rep. George Allen, which was eliminated to create a black-majority district in accordance with the Voting Rights Act. Allen chose not to challenge Wolf, instead running for Governor of Virginia in 1993. The district kept approximately the same complexion after the 2000 apportionment by a Republican Virginia General Assembly, but lost territory in the outlying areas of the district to allow for population growth in Fairfax and Loudoun. In 2013, the Fairfax portion of the district held about 40 percent of the population, Loudoun county held 30 percent, and the remainder of the district at 30 percent.

During his final three terms, Wolf was the only Republican representing a district based in the Washington suburbs on either side of the Potomac River. The neighboring 11th district was taken by Democrat Gerry Connolly in 2008, while the last Republican representing a district on the Maryland side, Connie Morella, had been defeated in 2002.

Tenure
Wolf has been especially prominent in three areas: transportation, human rights, and gambling. Before he retired, he was the co-chair of the US Congress Tom Lantos Human Rights Commission, formerly the Human Rights Caucus.

Human rights 
Wolf has traveled extensively to places around the world where people are suffering, including five times to the Sudan since 1989. He has advocated for relief of the Darfur genocide.
He has also convened conferences in his district to address human rights issues around the world.

After the trial of the leadership of the Baháʼí Faith of Iran was announced on February 11, 2009, Wolf voiced his deep concern over the "systematic persecution" of the Baháʼís. On February 13, Wolf offered a resolution on the subject of the Iranian trial, co-sponsored by seven others, in H. RES. 175 – "Condemning the Government of Iran for its state-sponsored persecution of its Baháʼí minority and its continued violation of the International Covenants on Human Rights"; the resolution was referred to the Committee on Foreign Affairs. The situation in Iran gathered international attention, including defense of Iranian Nobel Laureate attorney Shirin Ebadi in June, after she received threats in April warning her against making speeches abroad, including her defending Iran's minority Baháʼí community.

On September 30, 2010, Wolf spoke against human trafficking during a Black Women United for Action conference at Mount Vernon, George Washington's historic home.

On February 28, 2014, along with the Democrat Jackie Speier, Wolf became the co-chair of the Ahmadiyya Muslim Caucus, a group created in response to the ongoing persecution of Ahmadis. On May 9, 2014, Wolf introduced the United States Commission on International Religious Freedom Reauthorization Act of 2014 (H.R. 4653; 113th Congress), a bill that would amend the International Religious Freedom Act of 1998 to reauthorize the U.S. Commission on International Religious Freedom (USCIRF) as an independent federal government advisory body through FY2019.

China 
Wolf has vocally criticized the human rights record of China. Around the time of the 1995 International Women's Conference in Beijing, Wolf called for the Most Favored Nation status of China to be revoked, repeating the blood libel that human fetuses were considered a delicacy in China. He was one of the leading congressman trying to stop the grant of permanent MFN status to China in 1999.

When Wolf and Congressman Chris Smith were in Beijing shortly before the 2008 Summer Olympics, the Chinese security service prevented them from participating in a dinner meeting with local human rights lawyers.

In the 2011 United States federal budget, Wolf inserted a clause prohibiting NASA and the White House Office of Science and Technology Policy from any joint scientific activity with China for the remainder of the 2011 fiscal year. Wolf remarked, "We don't want to give them the opportunity to take advantage of our technology, and we have nothing to gain from dealing with them. And frankly, it boils down to a moral issue. ... Would you have a bilateral program with Stalin?" This prohibition resulted in Chinese journalists being denied access to the launching of Space Shuttle Endeavour on the mission STS-134, that was carrying the Alpha Magnetic Spectrometer which was built in part by Chinese scientists.

In June 2014, Wolf got House support for an amendment that would rename the street holding the Chinese embassy; the amendment would change International Place to Liu Xiaobo Plaza, in honor of Chinese dissident Liu Xiaobo.

Iraq War 
During the Bush administration, Wolf voted consistently with the President's positions. For example, Wolf voted in favor of military action in Iraq in 2002. He also voted to make the Patriot Act permanent, opposed requiring Foreign Intelligence Surveillance Act warrants for wiretaps within the United States, and supported the president in restricting congressional oversight for CIA interrogations.

However, in March 2006, Congress, at Wolf's suggestion by inserting an earmark into a supplemental appropriation bill, and in a breach with the Bush administration, announced the creation of the Iraq Study Group to reassess the U.S. strategy in Iraq.

Social issues 
Wolf opposes abortion and subsidized birth control for federal employees. As congressman, Wolf also voted to deny funding to Planned Parenthood. He also opposes the funding for international family planning in developing countries. Wolf also previously asserted that marriage should only be between one man and one woman. As such, he signed a letter supporting the "one man one woman" issue in the Manhattan Declaration. Wolf sponsored the bill that became the District of Columbia Civil Contempt Imprisonment Limitation Act, in 1989 and supported the bill that became the Elizabeth Morgan Act in 1996.

Gambling 
A 2005 Washington Post article cited "opposition to the spread of gambling" as one of Wolf's "central causes". Wolf sought to revise the regulation process for gambling on Native American reservations.

Committee assignments
 Committee on Appropriations
 Subcommittee on Commerce, Justice, Science, and Related Agencies (Chairman)
 Subcommittee on Transportation, Housing and Urban Development, and Related Agencies

Caucus memberships
 Tom Lantos Human Rights Commission (Co-Chair)
 International Conservation Caucus
 Sportsmen's Caucus

In the 109th Congress, Wolf was chairman of Subcommittee on Foreign Operations, Export Financing, and Related Programs, and its ranking minority member in the 110th. He was co-chairman of the Congressional Human Rights Caucus with Jim McGovern, who replaced the late Tom Lantos. Wolf is a member of the Moderate Republican Main Street Partnership.

Electoral history

References

External links

 
 
 
Videos
  at Ethnic Community Campaign Rally, VA, September 9, 2006
  at GOP Civic Picnic at Vint Hill, September 16, 2006
 

|-

|-

|-

|-

1939 births
21st-century American politicians
American people of German descent
American Presbyterians
Georgetown University Law Center alumni
Living people
People from Fairfax County, Virginia
Politicians from Philadelphia
Pennsylvania State University alumni
Republican Party members of the United States House of Representatives from Virginia
United States Army officers
Virginia lawyers